The medicine of the ancient Egyptians is some of the oldest documented. From the beginnings of the civilization in the late fourth millennium BC until the Persian invasion of 525 BC, Egyptian medical practice went largely unchanged and included simple non-invasive surgery, setting of bones, dentistry, and an extensive set of pharmacopoeia. Egyptian medical thought influenced later traditions, including the Greeks.

Sources of information

Until the 19th century, the main sources of information about ancient Egyptian medicine were writings from later in antiquity. The Greek historian Herodotus visited Egypt around 440 BC and wrote extensively of his observations of their medicinal practice. Pliny the Elder also wrote favorably of them in historical review. Hippocrates (the "father of medicine"), Herophilos, Erasistratus and later Galen studied at the temple of Amenhotep, and acknowledged the contribution of ancient Egyptian medicine to Greek medicine.

In 1822, the translation of the Rosetta stone finally allowed the translation of ancient Egyptian hieroglyphic inscriptions and papyri, including many related to medical matters (Egyptian medical papyri). The resultant interest in Egyptology in the 19th century led to the discovery of several sets of extensive ancient medical documents, including the Ebers papyrus, the Edwin Smith Papyrus, the Hearst Papyrus, the London Medical Papyrus and others dating back as far as 2900 BC.

The Edwin Smith Papyrus is a textbook on surgery and details anatomical observations and the "examination, diagnosis, treatment, and prognosis" of numerous ailments. It was probably written around 1600 BC, but is regarded as a copy of several earlier texts. Medical information in it dates from as early as 3000 BC. It is thus viewed as a learning manual. Treatments consisted of ointments made from animal, vegetable or fruit substances or minerals. There is evidence of oral surgery being performed as early as the 4th Dynasty (2900–2750 BC).

The Ebers papyrus (c. 1550 BC) includes 877 prescriptions – as categorized by a modern editor – for a variety of ailments and illnesses, some of them involving magical remedies, for Egyptian beliefs regarding magic and medicine were often intertwined. It also contains documentation revealing awareness of tumors, along with instructions on tumor removal.

The Kahun Gynaecological Papyrus treats women's complaints, including problems with conception. Thirty four cases detailing diagnosis and treatment survive, some of them fragmentarily. Dating to 1800 BC, it is the oldest surviving medical text of any kind.

Other documents such as the Hearst papyrus (1450 BC), and Berlin Papyrus (1200 BC) also provide valuable insight into ancient Egyptian medicine.

Other information comes from the images that often adorn the walls of Egyptian tombs and the translation of the accompanying inscriptions. Advances in modern medical technology also contributed to the understanding of ancient Egyptian medicine. Paleopathologists were able to use X-rays and later CAT Scans to view the bones and organs of mummies. Electron microscopes, mass spectrometry and various forensic techniques allowed scientists unique glimpses of the state of health in Egypt 4000 years ago.

Nutrition
The ancient Egyptians were at least partially aware of the importance of diet, both in balance and moderation. Owing to Egypt's great endowment of fertile land, food production was never a major issue, although, no matter how bountiful the land, paupers and starvation still exist. The main crops for most of ancient Egyptian history were emmer wheat and barley. Consumed in the form of loaves which were produced in a variety of types through baking and fermentation, with yeast greatly enriching the nutritional value of the product, one farmer's crop could support an estimated twenty adults. Barley was also used in beer. Vegetables and fruits of many types were widely grown. Oil was produced from the linseed plant and there was a limited selection of spices and herbs. Meat (sheep, goats, pigs, wild game) was regularly available to at least the upper classes and fish were widely consumed, although there is evidence of prohibitions during certain periods against certain types of animal products; Herodotus wrote of the pig as being 'unclean'. Offerings to King Unas (c. 2494–2345 BC) were recorded as "...milk, three kinds of beer, five kinds of wine, ten loaves, four of bread, ten of cakes, four meats, different cuts, joints, roast, spleen, limb, breast, quail, goose, pigeon, figs, ten other fruits, three kinds of corn, barley, spelt, five kinds of oil, and fresh plants..."

It is clear that the Egyptian diet was not lacking for the upper classes and that even the lower classes may have had some selection (Nunn, 2002).

Pharmacology 

Like many civilizations in the past, the ancient Egyptians amply discovered the medicinal properties of plant life around them. The Edwin Smith Papyrus contains many recipes to help heal different ailments. One short section of the papyrus lays out five recipes: one dealing with problems women may have had, three on techniques for refining the complexion, and the fifth recipe for ailments of the colon. The ancient Egyptians were known to use honey as medicine, and the juices of pomegranates served as both an astringent and a delicacy." In the Ebers Papyrus, there are over 800 remedies; some were topical-like ointments and wrappings, others were oral medication such as pills and mouth rinses; still others were taken through inhalation. The recipes to cure constipation consisted of berries from the castor oil tree, Male Palm, and Gengent beans, just to name a few. One recipe that was to help headaches called for "inner-of-onion, fruit-of-the-am-tree, natron, setseft-seeds, bone-of-the-sword-fish, cooked, redfish, cooked, skull-of-crayfish, cooked, honey, and abra-ointment." Some of the recommended treatments made use of cannabis and incense. "Egyptian medicinal use of plants in antiquity is known to be extensive, with some 160 distinct plant products..." Amidst the many plant extracts and fruits, the Egyptians also used animal feces and even some metals as treatments. These prescriptions of antiquity were measured out by volume, not weight, which makes their prescription-making craft more like cooking than what pharmacists do today. While their treatments and herbal remedies seem almost boundless, they still included incantations along with some therapeutic remedies.

Egyptian drug therapy is considered ineffective by today's standards according to Michael D. Parkins, who says that 28% of 260 medical prescriptions in the Hearst Papyrus had ingredients which can be perceived "to have had activity towards the condition being treated" and another third supplied to any given disorder would produce a purgative effect on the gastrointestinal system.

Practices

Egyptians had some knowledge of human anatomy. For example, in the classic mummification process, mummifiers knew how to insert a long hooked implement through a nostril, breaking the thin bone of the braincase and removing the brain, but more commonly created a hole in the back of the head so that the brain and other fluids could drain from the foramen magnum. They also had a general idea that inner organs are in the body cavity. They removed the organs through a small incision in the left groin. Whether this knowledge was passed down to the practitioners is unknown; yet it did not seem to have had any impact on their medical theories.

Egyptian physicians were aware of the existence of the pulse and its connection to the heart. The author of the Smith Papyrus even had a vague idea of the cardiac system. However, he did not know about blood circulation and deemed it unimportant to distinguish between blood vessels, tendons, and nerves. They developed their theory of "channels" that carried air, water, and blood to the body by analogies with the River Nile; if it became blocked, crops became unhealthy. They applied this principle to the body: If a person was unwell, they would use laxatives to unblock the "channels".

The oldest written text mentioning enemas is the Ebers Papyrus and many medications were administered using enemas. One of the many types of medical specialists was an Iri, the Shepherd of the Anus.

Many of their medical practices were effective, such as the surgical procedures given in the Edwin Smith papyrus. Mostly, the physicians' advice for staying healthy was to wash and shave the body, including under the arms, to prevent infections. They also advised patients to look after their diet, and avoid foods such as raw fish or other animals considered to be unclean.

Surgery
The oldest metal (Bronze or copper
) surgical tools in the world were discovered in the tomb of Qar.
Surgery was a common practice among physicians as treatment for physical injuries. The Egyptian physicians recognized three categories of injuries; treatable, contestable, and untreatable ailments. Treatable ailments the surgeons would quickly set to right. Contestable ailments were those where the victim could presumably survive without treatment, so patients assumed to be in this category were observed and if they survived then surgical attempts could be made to fix the problem with them. They used knives, hooks, drills, forceps, pincers, scales, spoons, saws and a vase with burning incense.

Circumcision of males was the normal practice, as stated by Herodotus in his Histories. Though its performance as a procedure was rarely mentioned, the uncircumcised nature of other cultures was frequently noted, the uncircumcised nature of the Libyans was frequently referenced and military campaigns brought back uncircumcised phalli as trophies, which suggests novelty. However, other records describe initiates into the religious orders as involving circumcision which would imply that the practice was special and not widespread. The only known depiction of the procedure, in The Tomb of the Physician, burial place of Ankh-Mahor at Saqqara, shows adolescents or adults, not babies. Female circumcision may have been practiced, although the single reference to it in ancient texts may be a mistranslation.

Prosthetics, such as artificial toes and eyeballs, were also used; typically, they served little more than decorative purposes. In preparation for burial, missing body parts would be replaced; however, these do not appear as if they would have been useful, or even attachable, before death.

The extensive use of surgery, mummification practices, and autopsy as a religious exercise gave Egyptians a vast knowledge of the body's morphology, and even a considerable understanding of organ functions. The function of most major organs was correctly presumed—for example, blood was correctly guessed to be a transpiration medium for vitality and waste which is not too far from its actual role in carrying oxygen and removing carbon dioxide—with the exception of the heart and brain whose functions were switched.

Dentistry
Dentistry was an important field, as an independent profession it dated from the early 3rd millennium BC, although it may never have been prominent. The Egyptian diet was high in abrasives from sand left over from grinding grain and bits of rocks in which the way bread was prepared, and so the condition of their teeth was poor. Archaeologists have noted a steady decrease in severity and incidence of worn teeth throughout 4000 BC to 1000 AD, probably due to improved grain grinding techniques. All Egyptian remains have sets of teeth in quite poor states. Dental disease could even be fatal, such as for Djedmaatesankh, a musician from Thebes, who died around the age of thirty five from extensive dental disease and a large infected cyst. If an individual's teeth escaped being worn down, cavities were rare, due to the rarity of sweeteners. Dental treatment was ineffective and the best sufferers could hope for was the quick loss of an infected tooth. The Instruction of Ankhsheshonq contains the maxim "There is no tooth that rots yet stays in place". No records document the hastening of this process and no tools suited for the extraction of teeth have been found, though some remains show sign of forced tooth removal. Replacement teeth have been found, although it is not clear whether they are just post-mortem cosmetics. Extreme pain might have been medicated with opium.

Doctors and other healers

The ancient Egyptian word for doctor is "swnw". This title has a long history. The earliest recorded physician in the world, Hesy-Ra, practiced in ancient Egypt. He was  "Chief of Dentists and Physicians" to King Djoser, who ruled in the 27th century BC. The lady Peseshet (2400 BC) may be the first recorded female doctor: she was possibly the mother of Akhethotep, and on a stela dedicated to her in his tomb she is referred to as imy-r swnwt, which has been translated as "Lady Overseer of the Lady Physicians" (swnwt is the feminine of swnw).

There were many ranks and specializations in the field of medicine. Royalty employed their own swnw, even their own specialists. There were inspectors of doctors, overseers and chief doctors. Known ancient Egyptian specialists are ophthalmologist, gastroenterologist, proctologist, dentist, "doctor who supervises butchers" and an unspecified "inspector of liquids". The ancient Egyptian term for proctologist, neru phuyt, literally translates as "shepherd of the anus". The latter title is already attested around 2200 BC by Irynachet.

Institutions, called (Per Ankh) or Houses of Life, are known to have been established in ancient Egypt since the 1st Dynasty and may have had medical functions, being at times associated in inscriptions with physicians, such as Peftauawyneit and Wedjahorresnet living in the middle of the 1st millennium BC. By the time of the 19th Dynasty their employees enjoyed such benefits as medical insurance, pensions and sick leave.

Table of ancient Egyptian physicians

Table of ancient Egyptian medical papyri

See also
 Ancient Greek medicine
 Byzantine medicine
 Medicine in ancient Rome
 History of medicine
 Unani

References

Further reading
 English
 Ancient Egyptian Medicine, John F. Nunn, 1996
 The Greatest Benefit to Mankind: A medical History of Humanity, Roy Porter, 1997
 A History of Medicine, Lois N. Magner, 1992
 Medicine in the Days of the Pharaohs, Bruno Halioua, Bernard Ziskind, M. B. DeBevoise (Translator), 200
 Pharmacological practices of ancient Egypt, Michael D. Parkins, 10th Annual Proceedings of the History of Medicine Days, 2001
 Pain, Stephanie. (2007). "The pharaohs' pharmacists." New Scientist. 15 December 2007, pp. 40–43

 French
 Ange Pierre Leca, La Médecine égyptienne au temps des Pharaons, éd. Dacosta, Paris, 1992
 Thierry Bardinet, Les papyrus médicaux de l'Égypte pharaonique, éd. Fayard, Paris, 1995
 Histoire de la médecine en Egypte ancienne, Paris, 2013– (http://medecineegypte.canalblog.com/)
 Richard-Alain Jean, À propos des objets égyptiens conservés du musée d’Histoire de la Médecine, éd. Université René Descartes – Paris V, coll. Musée d'Histoire de la Médecine de Paris, Paris, 1999
 Richard-Alain Jean, La chirurgie en Égypte ancienne. À propos des instruments médico-chirurgicaux métalliques égyptiens conservés au musée du Louvre, Editions Cybele, Paris, 2012
 Richard-Alain Jean, Anne-Marie Loyrette, À propos des textes médicaux des Papyrus du Ramesseum nos III et IV, I : la reproduction, in S.H. Aufrère (éd.), Encyclopédie religieuse de l’Univers végétal (ERUV – II), Montpellier, 2001, pp. 537–564
 Richard-Alain Jean, Anne-Marie Loyrette, À propos des textes médicaux des Papyrus du Ramesseum nos III et IV, I : la contraception, in S.H. Aufrère (éd.), Encyclopédie religieuse de l’Univers végétal (ERUV – II), Montpellier, 2001, pp. 564–592
 Bruno Halioua, La médecine au temps des Pharaons, éd. Liana Levi, coll. Histoire lieu, Paris, 2002
 Richard-Alain Jean, Anne-Marie Loyrette, À propos des textes médicaux des Papyrus du Ramesseum nos III et IV, I : la gynécologie (1), in S.H. Aufrère (éd.), Encyclopédie religieuse de l’Univers végétal (ERUV – III), Montpellier, 2005, pp. 351–487
 Richard-Alain Jean, Anne-Marie Loyrette, La mère, l’enfant et le lait en Égypte Ancienne. Traditions médico-religieuses. Une étude de sénologie égyptienne, S.H. Aufrère (éd.), éd. L’Harmattan, coll. Kubaba – Série Antiquité – Université de Paris 1, Panthéon Sorbonne, Paris, 2010

 German
 Wolfhart Westendorf, Handburch der altägyptischen Medizin, éd. Brill, coll. HdO, Leiden, 1999 (Band 1 : , Band II)

External links

 Medicine in Old Egypt – Transcript from History of Science by George Sarton
 Ancient Egyptian Medicine – Aldokkan
 Ancient Egyptian Medicine
 Brian Brown (ed.) (1923) The Wisdom of the Egyptians. New York: Brentano's
 Texts from the Pyramid Age by Nigel C. Strudwick, Ronald J. Leprohon, 2005, Brill Academic Publishers
 Ancient Egyptian Science: A Source Book by Marshall Clagett, 1989
  Site sur la médecine et la chirurgie dans l'Antiquité Egyptienne.
  Ancient medicine website

 
Egyptian
Medicine
Medicine
Medicine
Egypt
Medicine
Medicine